Events from 1428 in Catalonia.

Incumbents

 Count of Barcelona – Alfonso IV
 President of the Generalitat of Catalonia – Felip de Malla

Events

 2 February – Earthquake at the north of Catalonia, hundreds of people killed.

References

Catalonia
15th century in Catalonia